Burrishoole Friary (Irish: Minister Bhuiríos Umhaill) was a Dominican friary in County Mayo, Ireland. Its ruin is a National Monument.

Burrishoole Friary was founded in 1470 by Richard de Burgo of Turlough, Lord MacWilliam Oughter. It was built without the permission of Pope Paul II (term 1464-1471). In 1486, Pope Innocent VIII (term 1484-1492) instructed Uilliam Seóighe, the Archbishop of Tuam (term 1485-1501) to forgive the friars. Richard de Burgo resigned his lordship in 1469 and entered the friary which he had founded. He remained a friar until his death in 1473.  This was not an uncommon occurrence, and serves to illustrate the connection between patrons and their foundations at the time.

The church and the eastern wall of the cloister remain.  The grounds of the friary are an actively used cemetery.

Burrishoole Friary is a few kilometers west of the town of Newport, County Mayo.  It is often called Burrishoole Abbey, although this colloquial name is inaccurate as because the Dominican order did not have abbots, Dominican houses are not technically abbeys.

Almost all the friaries and abbeys across Ireland were suppressed in the wake of the Reformation in the 16th century. Very few were rebuilt after that time and now only the ruins survive, pleasing, if poignant, late Gothic relics of what must have been among the most striking buildings in the countryside of pre-Tudor Ireland.

Gallery

See also
 Dominicans in Ireland
 List of abbeys and priories in Ireland (County Mayo)
 Images of Burrishoole friary

Notes

References

 Monument sign in front of the Friary

Religious buildings and structures completed in 1470
History of County Mayo
Buildings and structures in County Mayo
1470 establishments in Ireland
Religious organizations established in the 1470s
Religion in County Mayo
Tourist attractions in County Mayo
Dominican monasteries in the Republic of Ireland
Ruins in the Republic of Ireland
Christian monasteries established in the 15th century
National Monuments in County Mayo